Proteus, also known as Neptune VIII, is the second-largest Neptunian moon, and Neptune's largest inner satellite. Discovered by Voyager 2 spacecraft in 1989, it is named after Proteus, the shape-changing sea god of Greek mythology. Proteus orbits Neptune in a nearly equatorial orbit at a distance of about 4.75 times the radius of Neptune's equator.

Its surface is dark, neutral in color, and heavily cratered. There are also a number of scarps, grooves, and valleys related to large craters.

Proteus is probably not an original body that formed with Neptune. It could have accreted later from the debris formed when the largest Neptunian satellite, Triton, was captured.

Discovery and naming 

Proteus was discovered from the images taken by the Voyager 2 space probe two months before its Neptune flyby in August 1989. Proteus was the third moon of Neptune to be discovered, 40 years after the discovery of Neptune's moon Nereid in 1949.

Upon discovery, Proteus received the temporary provisional designation S/1989 N 1. Stephen P. Synnott and Bradford A. Smith announced its discovery on July 7, 1989, speaking only of "17 frames taken over 21 days", which gives a discovery date of sometime before June 16.

On 16 September 1991, S/1989 N 1 was named after Proteus, the shape-changing sea god of Greek mythology.

Orbit 

The orbit of Proteus is nearly circular, having a small orbital eccentricity, and is inclined by about 0.5 degrees to Neptune's equator. Proteus is tidally locked to Neptune, and rotates synchronously with its orbital motion, which means that Proteus always presents the same face to Neptune.

Proteus may have once been in a 1:2 orbital resonance with Larissa, where Proteus makes one orbit for every two orbits made by Larissa. Due to the outward tidal migration of Proteus in the past, the orbital resonances of Proteus and Larissa are no longer in effect. Proteus may have ceased its integral orbital resonance with Larissa several hundred million years ago.

Physical characteristics 

Proteus is the second-largest moon of Neptune and is the largest of its regular prograde moons. It was not discovered by Earth-based telescopes because Proteus orbits so close to Neptune that it is lost in the glare of reflected sunlight.

Composition 

The surface of Proteus is dark as it has a geometrical albedo of about 10 percent–meaning that its surface reflects 10 percent of the light it receives from the Sun. The color of its surface is neutral as the reflectivity does not change appreciably with the wavelength from violet to green. In the near-infrared range of around the wavelength of 2 μm, Proteus's surface becomes less reflective, indicating the possible presence of complex organic compounds such as hydrocarbons or cyanides. These compounds may be responsible for the low albedo of the inner Neptunian moons. Although Proteus is usually thought to contain significant amounts of water ice, it has not been detected spectroscopically on the surface.

Shape 

Saturn's moon Mimas has an ellipsoidal shape despite being slightly less massive than Proteus, perhaps due to the higher temperature near Saturn or tidal heating. Proteus is slightly elongated in the direction of Neptune, although its overall shape is closer to an irregular polyhedron than to a triaxial ellipsoid. The surface of Proteus shows several flat or slightly concave facets measuring from 150 to 200 km in diameter. They are probably degraded impact craters.

Surface features 

Proteus is heavily cratered, showing no sign of any geological modification. Its depth is about 10–15 km. The crater has a central dome on its floor a few kilometres high. Pharos is the only named surface feature on this moon: the name is Greek and refers to the island where Proteus reigned. In addition to Pharos there are several craters 50–100 km in diameter and many more with diameters less than 50 km.

Other landforms on Proteus include linear features such as scarps, valleys, and grooves. The most prominent one runs parallel to the equator to the west of Pharos. These features likely formed as a result of the giant impacts, which formed Pharos and other large craters or as a result of tidal stresses from Neptune.

Named features 
Protean craters are named after water-related spirits, gods, goddesses (excluding Greek and Roman names). As of June 2021, there is only one named crater on this body.

Origin 

Proteus, like the other inner moons of Neptune, is unlikely to be an original body that formed with it, and is more likely to have accreted from the rubble that was produced after Triton's capture. Triton's orbit upon capture would have been highly eccentric, and would have caused chaotic perturbations in the orbits of the original inner Neptunian moons, causing them to collide and reduce to a disc of rubble. Only after Triton's orbit became circularised did some of the rubble disc re-accrete into the present-day moons of Neptune.

Proteus initially had a smaller orbit around Neptune, and may have formed closer to the planet. At the time of the formation of Proteus, its orbit was estimated to be  less than its current distance from Neptune. Over time, Proteus migrated outward from Neptune through tidal interactions. During the outward migration of Proteus, collisions and impact events may have formed large craters and had ejected fragments of Proteus into orbit around Neptune. A collision of Proteus and another object could possibly explain the origin of Neptune's smaller moon Hippocamp, which orbits close to Proteus.

Notes

References

External links 

 Proteus In Depth at NASA's Solar System Exploration site
 Proteus page at The Nine Planets
 Proteus, A Moon Of Neptune on Views of the Solar System
 Ted Stryk's Proteus Page
 Neptune's Known Satellites (by Scott S. Sheppard)

 
Moons of Neptune
19890616
Articles containing video clips
Moons with a prograde orbit